Swifts Football Club were a football team based in Slough, England.

History

The club was founded in 1869 by Mr W. Mansfield Gardner, Mr R.T. Smith, and Mr F. Mitchell, of Slough, who also formed the Uxbridge club two years later.  The club played home matches on a ground near The Dolphin public house, Slough.  

The Swifts club  was originally a rugby union club but by 1873 had changed to the association code.  During the late-19th century the club produced several England players, most notable of whom was Charles Bambridge who made 18 appearances for the national team.  In 1873 the club inflicted a record home defeat on the Wanderers, beating a depleted side 5-0 at the Kennington Oval.

FA Cup

The club had some success in the FA Cup, reaching the semi-finals in 1874, 1876 and 1886.
In the 1873-74 FA Cup the club lost 2–0 at home to the Royal Engineers in the Semi-Final, 2 years later they would make the Semi-Final again this time losing 2–1 to eventual Champions Wanderers. It would be another ten years before Swifts would reach the FA Cup Semi-Finals again, this time against defending Champions Blackburn Rovers. Rovers would go on to win 2–1 on the 13 March 1886, a month later Blackburn would retain the FA Cup beating West Bromwich Albion.

In 1887-88 the club looked to have reached the fifth round, having beaten Crewe Alexandra 3-2 at the Queen's Ground in West Kensington, but the Railwaymen appealed the result on the basis that one of the crossbars was too low, one of the directors having measured the posts before the match and keeping the information private as an insurance policy.  The FA reluctantly upheld the protest and ordered a replay, which Crewe won 2-1.  The next month the Football Association passed a motion of censure against Crewe for conduct that was "most unsportsmanlike and calculated to degrade the game of association football in the estimation of those of the public who wish to see it played in a proper spirit."

Final years

The final matches for the club took place in late 1890, which included a defeat to Chiswick, a draw with the Old Foresters, and, finally, a 6-2 win over the Bradfield Waifs.  The side that faced the Foresters included only E.C. Bambridge from the semi-final team of four years before, although G. Brann, who played in the very last match, may have played under a pseudonym.

In 1891, Swifts merged with Slough Albion & Young Men's Friendly Society, to form a new club, Slough, who later became Slough Town.

Colours

The club colours were originally white with a black swift on the shirt and black stockings, and by 1877 it changed to black shirts with a white swift, white knickerbockers, and black stockings.

England international players
The following eight players played for England whilst on the books of Swifts F.C. (with the number of caps received whilst registered with Swifts F.C.):

Arthur Bambridge (3 caps)
Charles Bambridge (18 caps)
Ernest Bambridge (1 cap)
George Brann (3 caps)
Edward Haygarth (1 cap)
Francis Pawson (1 cap)
William Rose (3 caps)
Frank Saunders (1 cap)

Scotland international players
Andrew Watson (3 caps)

Honours

London Charity Cup:

 Winners: 1885-86, 1886-87
 Runners-up: 1887-88

Berkshire & Buckinghamshire Senior Cup:

Winners: 1879-80, 1881-82
Runners-up: 1882-83

References

External links

Slough Town F.C.
Defunct football clubs in England
Association football clubs established in 1868
Association football clubs disestablished in 1890
Sport in Slough
1868 establishments in England
1890 disestablishments in England
Defunct football clubs in Berkshire